The Oleson Park Music Pavilion, also known as the Karl King Bandshell, is located in Fort Dodge, Iowa, United States. The pavilion is associated with Karl King, a famed composer for concert and military bands, who advocated for its construction. It was designed by Henry L. Kamphoefner, a Sioux City architect at that time, who had previously designed the Grandview Park Music Pavilion in Sioux City. It was built as a Works Progress Administration (WPA) project. The WPA paid for 85% of its construction, with the City of Fort Dodge paying the rest. The poured concrete structure was built in a Modernist style with Art Deco overtones. The pavilion replaced a bandstand that was built in the 1920s in the city square. It was dedicated to King in 1976, and listed on the National Register of Historic Places in 2003.

References

Music venues completed in 1938
Art Deco architecture in Iowa
Modernist architecture in Iowa
Buildings and structures in Webster County, Iowa
Fort Dodge, Iowa
Amphitheaters in Iowa
National Register of Historic Places in Webster County, Iowa
Event venues on the National Register of Historic Places in Iowa
Works Progress Administration in Iowa
Music venues in Iowa